(Spanish for "golf sauce") is a cold sauce of somewhat thick consistency, common in Argentina. It is made from mayonnaise with a smaller amount of tomato-based sauce such as ketchup, as well as seasonings including pimento, oregano, and cumin.

Origin
According to legend, the sauce was invented by the physician Luis Federico Leloir in the mid-1920s at the golf club of the seaside resort Mar del Plata. Tired of eating shrimp and prawn with mayonnaise, he asked the waiter to bring various ingredients (vinegar, lemon, mustard, ketchup, and others) and experimented with different mixtures. The favourite was ketchup and mayonnaise. Leloir's companions named the result salsa golf, and its fame grew. Soon it also spread to neighboring Uruguay.

Recipes 

There are several recipes, but the sauce is always mostly mayonnaise with a tomato-based sauce like ketchup. Seasoning is added to give the sauce an Argentine flavor, such as pimento, oregano, and cumin. The mixture can also include Worcestershire sauce and mustard.

 is used to dress salad, meat, and other food, and it is the main ingredient in a typical Argentine dish called palmitos en salsa golf.

In neighboring Paraguay,  is also very popular and is sometimes eaten as a delicacy with quail eggs. In countries outside South America,  is more commonly known as Marie Rose sauce or fry sauce.

The Argentine dish Revuelto Gramajo is often served with this sauce.

See also 
 Comeback sauce
 Fry sauce
 Marie Rose sauce
 Russian dressing
 Thousand Island dressing
 List of dips
 List of sauces

References 

Argentine cuisine
Uruguayan cuisine
Mar del Plata
Sauces
Food combinations